George Ant is a Greek music video director in the Greek musical industry, who has worked with a wide range of artists, among them Giannis Ploutarhos, Shaya, Nikos Ganos (Nicko), Kelly Kelekidou, Nikos Karvelas, Mattyas, Dimos Anastasiadis, Mark Angelo, C:Real, Ηousetwins, Christos P., Giorgos Sampanis, Marina Sena and Slick Beats. He has also directed a number of short films and commercials.

Music videography

 Nicko - Break me
 Giannis Ploutarhos - De me pairnei
 Shaya - Lene
 Giorgos Sampanis - Ora Miden
 Nicko - Say my Name
 Mark Angelo feat. Mary Jeras - Insane
 Shaya feat. Housetwins & Slick beats - Summer all Around
 Dimos Anastasiadis - Psemata
 C:real - Athropines sheseis
 Ηousetwins feat. Lisa Rray - Feeling
 Nikos Karvelas & Lakis Papadopoulos - Ola einai mes'to myalo
 Christos P. - H kardia mou antimilaei
 Mattyas - Missing you
 Kelly Kelekidou - Teleftaia fora
 Marina Sena - To agori pou pligwnw
 Marina Sena - Poia Monaksia
 Nikos Ganos - Poso Akoma
 Vera Boufi - Se Thelo Dipla Mou
 Stella Kalli - Tipota

References

External links
http://www.georgeant.com/
https://www.facebook.com/george.ant

1983 births
Living people
Greek music video directors